The 2007 Subway 500, the 32nd race of the 2007 NASCAR Nextel Cup season and the sixth race in the Chase for the Nextel Cup, ran on Sunday, October 21, 2007, at Martinsville Speedway, located on the outskirts of Martinsville, Virginia.  This race was the fifteenth of sixteen series races to use NASCAR's Car of Tomorrow template, which will be made permanent as of the 2008 season.

Background

Qualifying
With a lap of 19.938 seconds at a speed of 94.974 miles per hour, seven time Martinsville winner Jeff Gordon took his sixth pole at the paperclip and 63rd of his career. Spring Martinsville winner Jimmie Johnson started fourth. South Boston natives Jeff and Ward Burton both struggled in qualifying, having to start 18th and 36th respectively.  Chase contender Tony Stewart started 34th.

Race
The 2007 running of the race set a record for cautions in this race, with 21 yellow flags flying for 127 laps. The race was eventually decided under caution, when, during the green-white-checkers, David Ragan spun in turn number 1, ending the single attempt at a racing finish.  With his third consecutive win at Martinsville, Johnson became the first driver since Rusty Wallace in 1994-1995 to win three straight races at the track.

Results

Points
Gordon's lead over Johnson in the standings was reduced to 58 points.  (See 2007 Chase for the NEXTEL Cup) for complete Chase standings).

For 35th place, and the last guaranteed starting spot, the #22 team (driver Dave Blaney for Bill Davis Racing) extended its lead over the #21 team (Bill Elliott for Wood Brothers/JTG Racing) to 142 points.

References

Subway 500
Subway 500
NASCAR races at Martinsville Speedway
October 2007 sports events in the United States